Sanong Chaiprakhom is a retired professional footballer from Thailand.

External links
Thai Premier League Profile

Living people
Sanong Chaiprakhom
1976 births
Association football forwards
Sanong Chaiprakhom
Sanong Chaiprakhom